Wallace Clyde Fife (2 October 1929 – 16 November 2017) was an Australian politician and minister in the New South Wales Government and Federal Government.

Early life
Fife was born in Wagga Wagga, New South Wales, and was educated at Wagga Wagga Public School, Wagga Wagga and Canberra Grammar School. In 1948 he started working in the federal secretariat of the Liberal Party and in 1949 he joined his family business, Fifes Produce Pty Ltd, in Wagga Wagga. He married Marcia Hargreaves Stanley in May 1952 and they had two daughters and two sons.

Political career
Fife was elected as the member for Wagga Wagga in the New South Wales Legislative Assembly in 1957. He was Minister for Mines from June 1967 to January 1975, Minister for Conservation from March 1971 to June 1972, Minister for Power from June 1972 to January 1975 and Minister for Transport and Minister for Highways from January 1975 until his retirement from the New South Wales Parliament in October 1975. The member for the federal seat of Farrer David Fairbairn had announced his resignation and Fife was pre-selected as the Liberal candidate for the next federal election.

Fife was elected to the Australian House of Representatives as the member for Farrer at the election on 13 December 1975. He was Minister for Business and Consumer Affairs from July 1977 to December 1979, Minister for Education from December 1979 to May 1982 and Minister for Aviation from May 1982 until the defeat of the Fraser government at the March 1983 election. Following an electoral distribution that moved Wagga Wagga into the Division of Hume, he stood for and won that seat at the 1984 election. His role in Opposition included a stint as Deputy Leader of the Opposition in the House of Representatives between May 1989 and April 1990, since Liberal deputy leader Fred Chaney was still a Senator. He retired from parliament prior to the 1993 election.

Honours
Honorary Doctor of Letters (HonDLitt) from Charles Sturt University.
Centenary Medal (1 January 2001), "For service to Australian society through the Commonwealth and state parliaments and government".

Notes

 

|-

|-

|-

|-

|-

|-

|-

|-

1929 births
2017 deaths
20th-century Australian politicians
Liberal Party of Australia members of the Parliament of New South Wales
Liberal Party of Australia members of the Parliament of Australia
Members of the New South Wales Legislative Assembly
Members of the Australian House of Representatives for Farrer
Members of the Australian House of Representatives for Hume
Members of the Australian House of Representatives
Members of the Cabinet of Australia
People educated at Canberra Grammar School
People from Wagga Wagga
Recipients of the Centenary Medal